Adeyto (also known as Adeyto Rex Angeli and Laura Windrath; born 3 December 1976) is a French artist, singer-songwriter, actress, director, photographer, university professor and fashion designer based in Japan.

Biography 
Adeyto was born in Strasbourg, France, to a French mother and German father.

Adeyto started acting at the age of 8. She moved to Japan in 1998 and has appeared in Japanese TV serials, movies and was a regular on major variety shows like Waratte Iitomo and Sma-Station.

As a photographer and cinematographer, Adeyto Rex Angeli works behind the camera. She was responsible for the cover photography for Akino Arai's 2008 single "Kin no nami sen no nami".

In 2005, she designed the stage costumes for the La Stella players of the opera La bohème presented the same year in Tokyo.

From July 2009, Adeyto became a professor at the University of Creation; Art, Music & Social Work.

As of 2012, producer Sir Ridley Scott chose Adeyto to be co-director & cinematographer for the upcoming film 『JAPAN IN A DAY [ジャパン イン ア デイ]』 to be released worldwide in 2013. The film reflects the life in Japan on 3.11.2012, a year after the east Japan earthquake and will be nationwide in cinemas from 11.3.2012. Japan in a Day is also the opening film for the 25th Tokyo International Film Festival.

Music 
Adeyto has released music video DVDs, including Greed (2007) and End of the Word, The Mortal and The Bridge (all in 2006). She was also the lead singer and songwriter for a band named Genetic Sovereign, based in Tokyo, which recorded the albums Luminary in 2004 and Tempus Aurum in 2005.

Her album Adeyto – Temptation de l'Ange was released by AVEX Trax in November 2008. In 2008, she also appeared as a DJ on the stage at the Tokyo Dome for X Japan's World Tour I.V Towards Destruction and sang for AVEX 20th Anniversary Club Legend Juliana's Tokyo.

Filmography

Films
 Meoto Manzai (2001) as Emma
 Hi wa mata noboru (2002) as secretary
 Returner (2002) as future technician (credited as Laura Windrash[sic])
 College of Our Lives (2003) aka Collage of Our Lives and Renai Shashin (Japan) as girl in NY church
 Get Up! (2003) as Marilyn Monroe
 Umizaru (2004) aka Sea Monkey (USA) as fashion model
 Peanuts (2006) as Itetsu's wife Toscania
 Die Silbermaske (2006) as Elis
 Sushi King Goes to New York (2008) as blonde judge
 Detroit Metal City (2008) as Jack Ill Dark's (Gene Simmons) girlfriend
 Japan in a day (2013) as Adeyto

Video games
 Ever17 (2011)
 Arms (2017) as Twintelle

Television appearances

Drama
 Namida wo Fuite (2000) as Catherine – FujiTV
 A side B – Simulation Garage (2001) as Susannah – BS-i
 A side B – Counseling Booth (2001) as Susannah – BS-i
 The Apartment (2002) as Nancy – TBS
 Hatsu Taiken (2002) as Movie Star – FujiTV
 Yanpapa (2002) as Jessica – TBS
 Jiku Keisatsu 2 (2002) as Marilyn Monroe – NTV
 A side B – Simulation Garage (2003) as Susannah – TBS
 Kanjo ga shinjatta (2004) as Italian lady – NTV
 Yonimo kimyō na monogatari: Aki no tokubetsu hen (2005) as "Bijo Kan" no Bijo – FujiTV
 Primadam (2006) as Prof. Sophie – NTV
 Ikiru (2007) as Anna – TV Asahi
 Yama Onna Kabe Onna (2007) as on-set French coach – FujiTV
 Mop Girl (2007) as Dr. Nastazia – TV Asahi
 First Kiss (2007) – FujiTV
 Yūkan Club (2007) as Sophie-Catherine – NTV
 Scrap Teacher (2008) as Claudia – NTV

Variety shows
 Waratte Iitomo – Fuji TV
 SMAP×SMAP – Fuji TV
 Sma-Station – TV Asahi
 Out and About (2008) – NHK
 Terebi de Furansugo (2008) – NHK
 Out and About'' (2009) – NHK

References

External links 

 Official Site
 Adeyto at AVEX Trax
 
 Adeyto Photographer Site

1976 births
Living people
French costume designers
French expatriates in Japan
French women pop singers
French women singer-songwriters
French film actresses
French television actresses
French video game actresses
French voice actresses
Musicians from Strasbourg
20th-century French actresses
20th-century French women singers
21st-century French actresses
21st-century French women singers